George Henry Clemence (January 13, 1865 - February 2, 1924) was an architect and fellow of the American Institute of Architects who lived and practiced in Worcester, Massachusetts.

Clemence was born in Worcester in 1865.  He attended the public schools in Worcester and began studying in the office of architect Stephen C. Earle in 1882.  He enrolled at the Massachusetts Institute of Technology in 1886, completing his studies in architecture there in 1891.  In 1892, he established his own architectural practice in Worcester.  He was a member of the Ancient Free and Accepted Masons and a fellow of the American Institute of Architects.  He served as the president of the Worcester Branch of the AIA for a time.  He was married to Anna Eliza McDonald in 1889, and they had a daughter, Hazel, in 1890.  At the time of the 1900 and 1910 United States Censuses, he was living in Worcester with his wife Anna and daughter Hazel.

A number of his works are listed on the National Register of Historic Places. They include:

In Worcester:
Beacon Street Firehouse 
Bloomingdale Firehouse
Dartmouth Street School
Elizabeth Street School
Harry Goddard House
Green Hill Park Shelter
Upsala Street School
Waldo Street Police Station

In Southbridge, Massachusetts:
Elm Street Fire House
LaCroix-Mosher House

References

19th-century American architects
Architects from Worcester, Massachusetts
1865 births
1924 deaths
20th-century American architects
MIT School of Architecture and Planning alumni
Fellows of the American Institute of Architects